Akçatepe is a village in the Tut District, Adıyaman Province, Turkey. The village is populated by Turkmens and had a population of 792 in 2021.

References

Villages in Tut District